Odrowąż is a Polish coat of arms of probably Moravian origin. It was used by many noble families known as szlachta in Polish in medieval Poland and later under the Polish–Lithuanian Commonwealth, branches of the original medieval Odrowążowie family as well as families connected with the Clan by adoption.

History

Okolski tells that the progenitor of this clan cut off both halves of the moustache of an adversary at a jousting match, and the flesh with it, with the arrow. Bogdan Balbin in notes to Epitome "Rerum Bohemicarum" [Summary of Bohemian Affairs], chapter 15, calls the arms of the Odrowaz family Sagitta circumflexa ["bent arrow"], and adds that some of the earliest houses in Bohemia bore these arms, of whom Tobias was Bishop of Prague, during the times of Premysl Otakar II. In German the arms are known as a "Bartausreisser"

Blazon 
Arms: Gules, an arrow in pale point to chief, the base double sarcelled and counter embowed, Argent. Out of a crest coronet a panache of peacock plumes proper, charged with the arms in fess. The shield is red, upon which is a silver arrow pointing upward, and the bottom is divided and curved on both ends. Out of a helmeted crown is a display of peacock plumes, upon which can be seen lying on its side 
the device as pictured on the shield.

The tinctures (colors) are: azure = blue; gules = red; sable = black; or = gold; argent = silver; vert = green. In heraldry all charges (pictures) on a shield are assumed to be facing dexter (right side).

Notable bearers
Notable bearers of this coat of arms include:
House of Odrowąż
 Jacek Odrowąż
 Czesław Odrowąż
 Iwo Odrowąż
 Jan Odrowąż from Sprowa
 Zofia Odrowąż
 Stanisław Odrowąż
 Andrzej Odrowąż
 Joachim Chreptowicz
 Eugen Ritter von Sypniewski-Odrowaz
 Sypniewski
 Bonifacius Sypniewski
 Stanisław Sypniewski
 Feliks Sypniewski
 Felicjan Sypniewski
 Jan Chryzostom Pieniążek
 House of Szydłowiecki
 Jakub Szydłowiecki
 Elżbieta Szydłowiecka
 Krzysztof Szydłowiecki
 Zofia Szydłowiecka
 Piotr Wysocki
 Maciej Szukiewicz
 Wojciech Szukiewicz
 Władysław Starewicz
 Zygmunt Pacanowski

Gallery

See also
 Polish heraldry
 Heraldic family
 List of Polish nobility coats of arms

Bibliography
 Tadeusz Gajl: Herbarz polski od średniowiecza do XX wieku : ponad 4500 herbów szlacheckich 37 tysięcy nazwisk 55 tysięcy rodów. L&L, 2007. .

External links 
  Odrowaz Coat of Arms and the bearers

References

Polish coats of arms